"Long Ago (and Far Away)" is a popular song with music by Jerome Kern, and lyrics about nostalgia by Ira Gershwin from the 1944 Technicolor film musical Cover Girl starring Rita Hayworth and Gene Kelly and released by Columbia Pictures. The song was nominated for the Academy Award for Best Original Song in 1944 but lost out to “Swinging on a Star”, from Going My Way. The song was published in 1944 and sold over 600,000 copies in sheet music in a year. In 2004 it finished #92 in AFI's 100 Years...100 Songs survey of top tunes in American cinema.

In the film it is sung by Rita Hayworth (dubbed by Martha Mears) to Gene Kelly, and later briefly reprised by Jinx Falkenburg. Charting versions were recorded almost simultaneously by Dick Haymes and Helen Forrest, Bing Crosby, Jo Stafford, and Perry Como.

The Dick Haymes-Helen Forrest recording was released by Decca Records as catalog number 23317. The record first reached the Billboard magazine charts on April 27, 1944 and lasted 11 weeks on the chart, peaking at #2.

The Jo Stafford recording was released by Capitol Records as catalog number 153. The record first reached the Billboard magazine charts on May 4, 1944 and lasted 12 weeks on the chart, peaking at #6.

The Perry Como recording was released by RCA Victor as catalog number 20-1569. The record first reached the Billboard magazine charts on May 11, 1944 and lasted three weeks on the chart, peaking at #8.

The Bing Crosby recording was released by Decca Records as catalog number 18608. The record first reached the Billboard magazine charts on June 29, 1944 and lasted four weeks on the chart, peaking at #5. The flip side, "Amor," also charted, making this a two-sided hit. The Crosby version of "Long Ago (and Far Away)" was used in the film Someone to Love (1987).

Johnny Desmond sang it in German with Glenn Miller and the American Band of the AEF during World War II. It was used as psychological warfare aimed at the German populace and especially the Wehrmacht.

The song was used in the film Till the Clouds Roll By (1946) when it was sung by Kathryn Grayson.

Recorded versions

John Abercrombie on 1996's Tactics
Beegie Adair
Ronnie Aldrich and his Orchestra
Ambrose and his Orchestra
Gene Ammons and Sonny Stitt on Boss Tenors in Orbit! (1962)
Chet Baker (1955) Chet Baker Sings and Plays
Tony Bennett and Bill Charlap
Acker Bilk
Paul Bley
Pat Boone (1964)
Connee Boswell
Les Brown and his Orchestra (vocal: Doris Day) (1945)
Dave Brubeck
Benny Carter
Frank Chacksfield and his Orchestra
Richard Clayderman
Rosemary Clooney (1979)
Perry Como (1944)
Bing Crosby (recorded May 3, 1944 and included in the album Bing Crosby – Jerome Kern.) 
Bob Crosby and his Orchestra
Meredith d'Ambrosio (1996)
Bobby Darin (1961)
Tommy Dorsey
Billy Eckstine
Percy Faith and his Orchestra
Michael Feinstein
Eddie Fisher
Helen Forrest and Dick Haymes (1944)
The Four Freshmen
The Four Lads (1956)
Judy Garland (1945)
Erroll Garner
Lesley Garrett (1996)

Ron Goodwin
Eydie Gormé
Robert Goulet (1965)
Stephane Grappelli
Johnny Hartman
Dick Haymes
The Hi-Lo's (1955)
Michael Holliday
Engelbert Humperdinck (1988)
Leslie Hutchinson
Joni James
Salena Jones
Shirley Jones and Jack Cassidy (1959)
Bev Kelly (1960)
Julie Kelly
Stan Kenton and his Orchestra
Peggy King (1984)
Dorothy Kirsten
Lee Konitz
Kay Kyser and his Orchestra
Jeanie Lambe (1998)
Vicky Lane (1959)
Mario Lanza (1951)
Steve Lawrence (1964)
Guy Lombardo and His Royal Canadians (vocal: Tony Craig) (1944)
London Philharmonic Orchestra
Vera Lynn
Gloria Lynne (1960)
Henry Mancini and his Orchestra
Mantovani and his Orchestra
Andrea Marcovicci
Sally Martin

Johnny Mathis (1965)
Bob McCarroll (2010) That Old Feeling
Sylvia McNair and André Previn (1994)
Marian McPartland (1985)
Martha Mears and Gene Kelly (Film Soundtrack, 1944)
Bette Midler
The Migil 5 (1964)
Glenn Miller and The AAF Band (vocal: Johnny Desmond) (1944)
Marion Montgomery
Joan Morris and William Bolcom
Marni Nixon (1988)
Emile Pandolfi
Jackie Paris (1960)
Art Pepper
Anthony Perkins (On A Rainy Afternoon)
Oscar Peterson
Jimmy Raney
Johnnie Ray
Cliff Richard (Love is Forever album, 1965)
Amália Rodrigues
Jo Stafford (1944)
George Shearing
Frank Sinatra (1944)
Rod Stewart (2005)
Richard Tauber (1944)
Kiri Te Kanawa (1993)
The Three Suns (Instrumental, 1944)
Mel Tormé
Elisabeth Welch (1989)
Paul Weston and his Orchestra
Margaret Whiting (1960)
Phil Woods

References

1944 singles
Songs about nostalgia
Songs with lyrics by Ira Gershwin
Songs with music by Jerome Kern
Songs written for films
Pop standards
Jo Stafford songs
1944 songs